The Middle Branch River is a  tributary of the Muskegon River in Osceola County, Michigan, in the United States.

See also
List of rivers of Michigan

References

Michigan  Streamflow Data from the USGS

Rivers of Michigan
Rivers of Osceola County, Michigan
Tributaries of Lake Michigan